Priestley is an unincorporated community in Lincoln County, West Virginia, United States. It is part of the Alum Creek census-designated place.

References

Unincorporated communities in Lincoln County, West Virginia
Unincorporated communities in West Virginia